Kpana Lewis (April 19, 1830 – May 10, 1912) was a Sherbro chief from Sierra Leone and an opponent of  colonial rule of the British. He exercised strong influence over all Sherbro chiefs. Part of his fame rested in his pervasive use of the Poro Secret Society to oppose the British colonialists. He was considered so powerful that, while Bai Bureh was allowed to return from exile after the 1898 Rebellion, Kpana Lewis continued to be held in exile in the Gold Coast (now Ghana), where he died in 1912.

Early life and leadership
Kpana Lewis was born in 1830 in Sherbro Island in the Southern Province of British Sierra Leone to a politically dominant family of the Sherbro aristocracy. His grandfather, Bai Kong Kuba Lewis was the most dominant king among all of the Sherbro people. Kong Kuba Lewis  signed a treaty ceding Sherbro country to the British in 1825, but the British did not exercise any direct authority over the Sherbros until the end of the century. Kpana Lewis assumed the leadership of the Sherbro people in 1879, after his father died. As a leader, Kpana Lewis was able to bring quite a few of the counties back under the authority of the Sherbro. He did this by using the enormous power of the Poro  Secret Society, of which he was a leading member. Poro is reported to have spread into the interior of Sierra Leone from Yoni on Sherbro Island, which was the capital of the Sherbro Kingdom and where Kpana Lewis resided. He thus came to restore something of the old glory of the Kong Kuba and regained authority over former mainland provinces of the once powerful Sherbro Kingdom.

When the British proclaimed a Protectorate in 1896, many of the terms of the Protectorate Ordinance were distasteful to the local rulers. Above all was the Hut Tax. Kpana Lewis was one of the few leaders who actually led a group of chiefs to the capital of Freetown to protest against the tax. While the British Governor informed him that the Sherbro in the Colony was unaffected by the tax, Kpana Lewis did not sit back and leave the other rulers to continue protesting alone because his own territory was not involved. On his return to Yoni, Kpana Lewis used the Poro to give force to his disgust with the colonial measures.

Rebellion
The Poro traditionally had a role of ensuring concerted action for political or economic purposes. It could as easily place a ban on war as on the harvest, a ban which no one dared disobey. It  thus fulfilled the role of a modern judiciary system and police force. It was this that Kpana Lewis used to effect a boycott of trade with Europeans and the Krio people who Kpana Lewis and other indigenous tribal leaders accused of supporting the British. When the District Commissioner called a meeting of chiefs in the area to warn them against any kind of rebellion, one of the chief said that he had to confer with  Kpana Lewis, whom he regarded as his leader. So great was his power and influence over these rulers that they were willing to openly defy powerful British officials in favour of Kpana Lewis' authority. The British then quickly passed a law making it a criminal offence to use the Poro to restrain trade.

When the Hut Tax War of 1898 broke out, led by Temne war-chief Bai Bureh, nothing could convince the District Commissioner that Kpana Lewis was not the brain behind the resistance. Even though the British had no evidence connecting Kpana Lewis with the Rebellion, he was detained as a suspect and was subsequently sent into exile in the Gold Coast along with Bai Bureh and the Mende chief Nyagua. The British then installed their own man, Fama Yani, as the leader of the  Sherbro people. Fearing that if Kpana Lewis returned and his presence would lead to the overthrow of Fama Yani, the British refused to allow his return, though Bai Bureh was ultimately brought back to Sierra Leone. Despite protests by Kpana Lewis' son, Kong Kuba, and of intervention by the Anti-Slavery Society in London, the British Government held him in the Gold Coast where he died after more than a decade in exile.

External links
BAI SHERBRO KPANA LEWIS (ca. 1830-1912) SHERBRO CHIEF AND OPPONENT OF COLONIAL RULE at www.sierra-leone.org

Sherbro people
Hut Tax War of 1898
1830 births
1912 deaths